Asi Gonia is a mountainous village and a former community in the eastern part of the Chania regional unit in Crete, Greece. Since the 2011 local government reform it is part of the municipality Apokoronas, of which it is a municipal unit. Asi Gonia is situated east of the Lefka Ori mountain range, 20 km southwest of Rethymno. The communal office is situated in the heart of the community. In the village square there are two statues dedicated to the two Greek prime ministers Eleftherios Venizelos and Sofoklis Venizelos.

Historical population

Famous natives
George Psychoundakis, resistance fighter and author of the Cretan Runner
Pavlos Gyparis, infantry Colonel of the Greek army
Andreas Papadakis, infantry Colonel of the Greek army and leader of AEAK
Stylianos Petrakis, Vice Admiral
Petromarkos, Cretean Revolutions Chief

References

External links
GTP Travel Pages (Municipality)

Populated places in Chania (regional unit)